Planet Crucon is the third full-length album by American hip hop group Crucial Conflict from Chicago, Illinois. It was released on January 15, 2008 through Buckwild Records. It is the group's first studio album in ten years, their last being 1998's Good Side Bad Side. It features guest appearances from George Clinton, Kendra Foster, Sonny Cool and Teddy Kane. The album peaked at number 73 on the Billboard Top R&B/Hip-Hop Albums chart.

Track listing

Personnel
Crucial Conflict
Corey "Coldhard" Johnson – main artist, vocals
Wondosas "Kilo" Martin – main artist, vocals
Marrico "Never" King – main artist, vocals
Ralph "Wildstyle" Leverston – main artist, vocals, executive producer
Additional vocalists
George Edward Clinton – vocals (track 8)
Kendra Foster – vocals (track 8)
Sonny Cool – vocals (track 11)
Teddy Kane – vocals (track 17)
Technical
C. Paul Johnson – engineering
Matt Hennessy – mixing
Alex Gross – mixing (track 10)
Krassi Kurtev – associate executive producer
Parrish Lewis – photography

Chart history

References

External links
Planet Crucon by Crucial Conflict at Discogs
Planet CruCon by Crucial Conflict on iTunes

2008 albums
Crucial Conflict albums